International Whores’ Day or International Sex Workers’ Day is observed annually on June 2 of each year, honours sex workers and recognises their often exploited working conditions. The event commemorates the occupation of Église Saint-Nizier in Lyon by more than a hundred sex workers on June 2, 1975 to draw attention to their inhumane working conditions. It has been celebrated annually since 1976. In German, it is known as Hurentag (Whore's Day). In Spanish-speaking countries, it is the Día Internacional de la Trabajadora Sexual, the International Day of the Sex Worker.

Background 

In the 1970s, French police kept sex workers under increasing pressure. The police reprisals forced sex workers to work increasingly in secret. As a result, protection of sex workers decreased and led to more violence against them. After two murders and the unwillingness of the government to improve the situation, sex workers in Lyon occupied the Saint-Nizier church in rue de Brest and went on strike. The striking workers sang political chants and demanded decent working conditions and an end to stigma.

The police cleared the church after eight days. The event marks the starting point of an international movement of sex workers for sex workers’ rights.

Germany 
A reading entitled "Women without rooms" in Bochum, Germany on 29 May 2011 documented that the situation of sex workers has not improved since 1975. The reading was devoted to the sex workers of the neighbouring city of Dortmund, who are oppressed as the sex workers of Lyon were in 1975.

Similar memorials 
 3 March - International Sex Workers' Rights Day.
 17 December - International Day to End Violence Against Sex Workers.

References

Further reading 
 Agustín, Laura Maria. "Sex at the Margins: Migration, Labour Markets and the Rescue Industry", 2007, Zed Books, 
 Agustín, Laura Maria. The Naked Anthropologist .
 
 Leigh, Carol. "Unrepentant Whore: The Collected Works of Scarlot Harlot", 2004, Last Gasp, 
 Nagle, Jill. "Whores and Other Feminists", 1997, Routledge, 
 Pheterson,Gail. "A Vindication of The Rights of Whores", 1989, Seal Press 
 Weitzer, Ronald. 1991. "Prostitutes’ Rights in the United States", Sociological Quarterly, v. 32, no.1, pages 23–41.''

External links

 

Network of Sex Work Projects (International)
International Sex Worker Foundation for Art, Culture and Education
International Union of Sex Workers

Prostitution
Sexuality and society
Sex workers' rights
Feminism and social class
June observances
Civil awareness days
Recurring events established in 1976